Kazimir Kotlinski (born 12 April 1974) is a Belarusian handball player for Victoria Regia Minsk and the Belarusian national team.

References

1974 births
Living people
Belarusian male handball players
Naturalized citizens of Poland